The 2015 Big Ten women's basketball tournament was held from March 4–8, 2015 at the Sears Centre in Hoffman Estates, IL.

Seeds

All 14 Big Ten schools participate in the tournament. Teams were seeded by 2014–15 Big Ten Conference season record. The top 10 teams received a first-round bye and the top 4 teams received a double bye.

Seeding for the tournament was determined at the close of the regular conference season:

Schedule

*Game times in Central Time. #Rankings denote tournament seeding.

Bracket

All-Tournament Team
 Lexie Brown, Guard, Maryland (Most Outstanding Player)
 Bethany Doolittle, Center, Iowa
 Alexa Hart, Forward, Ohio State
 Kelsey Mitchell, Guard, Ohio State
 Amanda Zahui B., Center, Minnesota

See also
2015 Big Ten Conference men's basketball tournament

References

Big Ten women's basketball tournament
Tournament
Big Ten women's basketball tournament
Big Ten women's basketball tournament
College basketball tournaments in Illinois